Raúl Guzmán Marchina (February 26, 1999, Guadalajara, México) is a Mexican racing driver, currently established in Bologna and participating in the Lamborghini Super Trofeo.

Career

Karting
Born in Guadalajara, Guzmán began karting in 2011, at age eleven, and claimed the SuperKarts USA title in 2014.

Italian F4 Championship
The following year he graduated to single-seaters in Italian F4, taking seventeenth in his debut season and third the following year after a battle for the title between himself, Mick Schumacher and eventual champion Marcos Siebert.

For 2017, Guzman switched to the Formula Renault 2.0 championships with R-ace GP. He had three-point-scoring finishes including highest finishing position on the fifth place at Silverstone. While in the standings he ended seventeenth, behind his teammates Will Palmer, Robert Shwartzman and Max Defourny.

Racing record

Career summary

† As Guzmán was a guest driver, he was ineligible for points.

Pro Mazda Championship

Complete Formula Regional European Championship results 
(key) (Races in bold indicate pole position; races in italics indicate fastest lap)

References

External links
 

1999 births
Living people
Sportspeople from Guadalajara, Jalisco
Mexican racing drivers
Italian F4 Championship drivers
Formula Renault Eurocup drivers
Indy Pro 2000 Championship drivers
Formula Regional European Championship drivers

Formula Renault 2.0 NEC drivers
Euroformula Open Championship drivers
RP Motorsport drivers
Target Racing drivers
R-ace GP drivers
Fortec Motorsport drivers
Lamborghini Super Trofeo drivers